Klyuchi is a rural locality (a selo) and the administrative center of Klyuchevsky Selsoviet, Askinsky District, Bashkortostan, Russia. The population was 170 as of 2010. There are 6 streets.

Geography 
Klyuchi is located 24 km southwest of Askino (the district's administrative centre) by road. Kuchanovo is the nearest rural locality.

References 

Rural localities in Askinsky District